Francisco Güerri Ballarín (born 13 April 1959) is a Spanish former professional footballer who played as a midfielder. He competed in the men's tournament at the 1980 Summer Olympics.

References

External links
 
 

1959 births
Living people
Association football midfielders
Spanish footballers
Spain international footballers
Spain youth international footballers
Olympic footballers of Spain
Footballers at the 1980 Summer Olympics
People from Ribagorza
Sportspeople from the Province of Huesca
Footballers from Aragon
Real Zaragoza players
UD Las Palmas players